William Chitterne (died 1412/13), of Wilton, Wiltshire, was an English attorney and Member of Parliament.

He was a Member (MP) of the Parliament of England for Wilton in 1373, October 1383, November 1384, 1385, February 1388, January 1390, January 1397, 1399 and 1402. He was Mayor of Wilton in 1391–92.

He died at some point between February 1412 and December 1413

References

14th-century births
1412 deaths
English MPs 1373
English MPs October 1383
People from Wilton, Wiltshire
English MPs November 1384
English MPs 1385
English MPs February 1388
English MPs January 1390
English MPs January 1397
English MPs 1399
English MPs 1402